Ivan Smirnov may refer to:

 Ivan Smirnov (politician) (1881–1936), Russian revolutionary
  (1885–1919), Russian revolutionary, Bolshevik
 Ivan Smirnov (aviator) (1895–1956), Russian pilot
 Ivan Smirnov (guitar player) (1955–2018), Russian guitarist
 Ivan Smirnov (cyclist) (born 1999), Russian cyclist

See also
 Smirnov (surname)
 Smirnoff (surname)